Tai-Pan is a 1986 adventure drama film directed by Daryl Duke, loosely based on James Clavell's 1966 novel of the same name. While many of the same characters and plot twists are maintained, a few smaller occurrences are left out. Filmed under communist Chinese censorship, some portions of Clavell's story were considered too offensive to be filmed as written and considerable changes were made.

The De Laurentiis Entertainment Group handled the production and were actively seen battling the Chinese Government and Labor boards over the film during shooting. The results fared poorly at the box office and in critical reviews. Duke believed that a mini-series à la Shōgun or Noble House would have been a far superior means of covering the complexity of Clavell's novel.

Plot
In 1842, the British have achieved victory of the First Opium War and seized Hong Kong. Although the island is largely uninhabited and the terrain unfriendly, it has a large port that both the British government and various trading companies believe will be useful for the import of merchandise to be traded on mainland China, a highly lucrative market.

Although the film features many characters, it is arguably Dirk Struan and Tyler Brock, former shipmates and the owners of two massive (fictional) trading companies who are the main focal points of the story. Their rocky and often abusive relationship as seamen initiated an intense amount of competitive tension.

Throughout, both men seek to destroy each other in matters of business and personal affairs. Struan is referred to as tai-pan (which author Clavell translates as "Supreme Leader", although this is not the accepted translation of the term) indicating his position as head of the largest and most profitable of all the trading companies operating in Asia. Brock, owner of the second largest of the trading companies, constantly  vies to destroy Struan's company and reputation in an attempt to both exact revenge on Struan and become the new "Tai-Pan" of Chinese trade.

While the film follows a similar structure as the novel, one major and notable event is left out. Struan's meeting with Jin Qua early in the film to obtain the forty lac dollars of silver to pay Brock omits Jin Qua's stipulation that four special coins be broken in half, with Struan keeping four halves and the other four being distributed by Jin Qua. When a half coin is presented to Struan that matches his own half, he is obligated to do a favor to the bearer. The first favor is called in later in the novel, by the pirate Wu Kwok. The film does not convey this.

Cast

 Bryan Brown as Dirk Struan
 Joan Chen as May–May
 John Stanton as Tyler Brock
 Tim Guinee as Culum Struan
 Bill Leadbitter as Gorth Brock
 Russell Wong as Gordon Chen
 Katy Behean as Mary Sinclair
 Kyra Sedgwick as Tess Brock
 Janine Turner as Shevaun Tillman
 Norman Rodway as Aristotle Quance
 John Bennett as Captain Orlov
 Derrick Branche as Vargas
 Vic Armstrong as Drunken sailor
 Dickey Beer as Brock's crew
 Cheng Chuang as Jin Qua
 Chen Shu as Chen Sheng
 Rosemarie Dunham as Mrs. Fothergill
 Robert Easton as Count Zergeyev
 Richard Foo as Lin Din
 Nicholas Gecks as Horatio Sinclair
 Carol Gillies as Liza Brock
 Pat Gorman as British merchant 2
 Michael C. Gwynne as Jeff Cooper
 Billy Horrigan as Brock's crew
 Patrick Ryecart as Captain Glessing
 Bert Remsen as Wilf Tillman
 Rob Spendlove as Nagrek
 Lisa Lu as Ah-Gip
 Barbara Keogh as Mrs. Quance
 Denise Kellogg as Nude model
 Joycelene Lu as Beaten whore
 Phil Chatterton (tongplaw) as Boatswain
 Frans Dames as a British officer and merchant

Production
There had been numerous attempts to film Tai Pan over the years.

1968 MGM proposed version
Martin Ransohoff of Filmways bought the rights in 1966 in conjunction with MGM for $500,000 plus a percentage of the profits. Clavell would write the script and co-produce. At the time Clavell was also working as a filmmaker, directing Sidney Poitier in To Sir, with Love.

Patrick McGoohan was announced to play Dirk Struan (the first of a two-picture deal he had with MGM) with Michael Anderson attached to direct. Carlo Ponti came in as co-producer. However the movie would have cost an estimated $26 million (later reduced to $20 million) and was postponed. It lingered on for a number of years before being finally cancelled when James T. Aubrey took over as president and cancelled the project.

Late 1970s proposed version
In 1975 Run Run Shaw had bought the rights from MGM and wanted to collaborate with Universal Studios to make a $12 million film. Carl Foreman wrote a screenplay, but the film was not made.

In the late 1970s Georges-Alain Vuille obtained the rights and George MacDonald Fraser was hired to adapt the novel. Fraser's script met with approval – Vuille hired him to write a sequel – Richard Fleischer was attached to direct, and Steve McQueen agreed to star for a reported fee of $3 million. McQueen dropped out of the project but was still paid $1 million.

Roger Moore became briefly attached, with John Guillermin mentioned as director of a possible mini-series. However finance could not be arranged. Moore said: "If it's offered to me again I'll do it". Quite frankly, it's one of the best scripts I've ever read". For a time Sean Connery was mooted as star for director Martin Ritt. "I've always wanted Sean to do it", said Clavell.

Vuille eventually lost the rights and Fraser's script was not used in the final film.

Eventual production
The popularity of the novel and TV series of Shogun made Tai Pan continually attractive to filmmakers. In late 1983 Dino De Laurentiis bought the rights. He set up the film with Orion. Sean Connery turned down the lead role.

The film was directed by Daryl Duke and starred Bryan Brown, who had worked together on The Thorn Birds.

It was the first English-language film shot in China. Shooting was extremely difficult, due in part to abundant red tape. De Laurentiis later claimed filming in China was a big mistake.

Reception
The film gained poor reviews. Walter Goodman of The New York Times said of it: "You have to say this for Tai-Pan: it's ridiculous – but in a big way. It's two hours of Super Comics: Bearded Brutes! Busty Belles! Bloody Blades! Exotic Settings! Colorful Costumes! A Beheading! A Castration! A Typhoon!" Roger Ebert called it "the embodiment of those old movie posters where the title is hewn from solid rock and tiny figures scale it with cannons strapped to their backs, while the bosoms of their women heave in the foreground. [...] Of the women of 'Tai-Pan,' it can be said that Joan Collins could have played each and every one of them at some point in her career". The Los Angeles Times''' Kevin Thomas said, "anyone who enjoyed James Clavell's epic novel of the early China traders can only wish that it had never arrived. So truly and consistently terrible is 'Tai-Pan' that it could stand as a textbook example of how not to adapt a historical adventure-romance into a movie". Chen was nominated for two Golden Raspberry Award as Worst Actress and Worst New Star.Tai-Pan'' holds a 13% rating on Rotten Tomatoes based on seven reviews.

Box office
The film was not a box office success.

Clavell expressed disappointment with the film adaptation: "I haven't seen the film. It just hasn't been convenient for me to see it... I would like to get the rights to my book back and turn it into a mini-series".

References

External links
 
 

1986 films
1980s adventure drama films
American adventure drama films
Films based on American novels
Films based on works by James Clavell
Films directed by Daryl Duke
Films set in 1842
Films set in Hong Kong
Films shot in China
Films produced by Raffaella De Laurentiis
De Laurentiis Entertainment Group films
Asian Saga
First Opium War
1986 drama films
Films with screenplays by Stanley Mann
Films with screenplays by John Briley
Films scored by Maurice Jarre
1980s English-language films
1980s American films